Richard Emory (1919–1994) was an American actor born in Santa Barbara, California. After serving in the military as a Marine in World War II, he started a career as an Actor. He achieved recognition in movies of the 1950s and 1960s and also found work as a Supporting actor in various television serials. He was the first son of one of the early power couples of the Silent Film era - Emory Johnson and Ella Hall. After his birth, a brother and two sisters would follow. Emory retired from Show business in 1963 and would spend the rest of his life working odd jobs. He died in February 1994 in Moab, Utah.

Early years

Richard Emory was born Emory Waldemar Johnson Jr. in  Santa Barbara, California, on January 27, 1919.

Johnson's father was a Universal actor named Emory Johnson. His mother was a Universal Ingénue Ella Hall. In 1917, while both actors were under contract with Universal, they married in a private ceremony. After their honeymoon, the couple moved into Emory Johnson's Los Angeles home along with Johnson's mother, Emilie Johnson. In 1918, Universal failed to renew Johnson and Hall's contracts. Emory Johnson continued as a free agent working on films. Hall's last movie before giving birth to Emory Waldemar was Three Mounted Men, released on October 7, 1918. Hall would not make another film until 1921.

Emory's brother, Alfred Barnard, was born on September 26, 1920. His oldest sister, Ellen Joanna, was born on April 18, 1923. By 1924, the Johnson marriage was crumbling, and Hall filed for divorce. Emory Johnson asked Hall to give the marriage one more try.

Tragedy struck in March 1926.  While Ella and the kids were crossing a busy street in Hollywood, Emory Waldemar's 5-year-old brother Alfred was struck and killed by a truck. The vehicle narrowly missed Emory. The accident fueled a reconciliation and Emory's parents decided to have one last child. Emory's sister, Diana Marie (Dinie), was born on October 27, 1929.

Since 1924, Emory Waldemar's parents had publicly battled over alimony payments, child support, visitation, and living conditions. The Johnson’s on-again and off-again relationship finally exhausted itself, and they finalized their divorce in 1930. Ella Hall and her three children moved in with Hall’s mother. Hall started a sales job at the upscale ladies' dress shop, I. Magnin, to support her three children. Hall's job paid well, and the kids had a comfortable upbringing. 

Yet, Hall would continue spending time in court contesting support payments. In 1932, Emory Johnson filed for bankruptcy, allowing him to lower his payments for Hall and the kids. This bickering was a major factor in the children's estrangement from their father.
  
At age ten, Emory Waldemar had an uncredited role in the 1930 Universal production of All Quiet on the Western Front released on April 21, 1930. Emory's sister, Ellen Joanna, age seven, claimed she played a young girl in the same movie.

The book The Encyclopedia of Feature Players of Hollywood, Volume 1, contains an interview with Richard Emory. He recalls his small part in All Quiet on the Western Front and his mother's role, playing an uncredited nurse. He did not remember his sister ever being on the set. We should note Johnson's recollections were forty years after the experience. He would have another uncredited part in the 1941 production of I Wanted Wings.

Military
The German invasion of Poland on September 1, 1939, signaled the opening of World War II. On September 3, 1939, Britain and France declared war on Germany. Although the United States did not participate in the initial declaration of war, certain visionaries thought something would ultimately drag the United States into the unfolding global hostilities.

One indisputable fact was that the United States military was unprepared to engage in any global war. National polls indicated an increasing majority of citizens were in favor of establishing a military draft. Bowing to this ever-increasing sentiment, Congress passed the ‘’Selective Training and Service Act of 1940’’, also known as the Burke–Wadsworth Act, .  It would become the first peacetime conscription in United States history. Franklin D. Roosevelt signed the bill into law on September 16, 1940.

The Selective Service Act required all men born between October 17, 1909, and October 16, 1919 (ages 21–35) living in the continental United States to register with local draft boards. The act of draft registration did not create any military enlistment. National lotteries established enlistment dates. The first national lottery occurred on October 29, 1940.

Wednesday, October 16, 1940, also known as R-Day, was the date all men between ages 21 and 35 were required to register for the draft. In North Hollywood, Emory Johnson Jr. stood in line to register at Selective Service Local Board 179. Other stars signing up at the local board included Henry Fonda, Don Ameche, Lon Chaney Jr., and Robert Taylor. Johnson registered using his full birth name of  According to his paperwork, he was a private in the Marine Corps Reserve. His draft card shows Johnson lived in North Hollywood, was twenty-one, six feet tall, weighed one hundred-sixty-two pounds, and had blue eyes and blond hair. His draft card was proof he had registered, and they advised him to keep it with him at all times.

Johnson enlisted in the Marine Corps Reserve on November 7, 1940. On December 8, 1941, the United States declares war on Japan. On December 11, 1941 the United States declares war on Germany and Italy. World War II ranged on until 1945.

Victory in Europe Day  (also known as V-E Day) marked the official end of World War II in Europe and is celebrated on May 8, 1945, Victory over Japan Day (also known as V-J Day) marked the official end of World War II and is celebrated on September 2, 1945. Johnson's Military Discharge date is listed as September 12, 1945. He was discharged from Marine Corps as Private First Class Quartermaster clerk.

Career

Johnson's first foray into acting was the 1930 film, "All Quiet on the Western Front."

Johnson's first play was named  and he played the character, Nekludov, the Lieutenant of the guards. The play was staged at a local theatre called the Santa Monica Players.

Before his enlistment on November 7, 1940, he landed a part in the film I Wanted Wings. Principal photography occurred between August 26 and December 19, 1940, and Paramount Pictures released the film on March 26, 1941. The movie featured Ray Milland, William Holden, and Veronica Lake. Johnson's part was uncredited.

Richard Emory's younger sister, Ellen Joanna Johnson (Ellen Hall), was born in 1923. Hall's first role in a movie was an uncredited young girl in "All Quiet on the Western Front." She was six years old. While Johnson served in the Marines, Ellen Hall made her cinematic debut with an uncredited part in the musical The Chocolate Soldier, released on October 31, 1941. Hall was 18 years old. Johnson's sister acted in various genres until she found her niche in B movie Westerns. In 1943, Hall got her first female lead in a Western titled Outlaws of Stampede Pass. She would continue acting throughout the 1940s and into the early 1950s. Her last role in a Western was the 1949 production of Lawless Code.

After his discharge from the marines on September 12, 1945, Johnson took a job in the wholesale florist business in San Francisco. He remained employed for a year and a half. He stated, 

When he left Gilliard's Playhouse, his  landed him a job as a runway and media model. He used modeling to supplement his income because of the lack of receiving a steady pay check generated from movie parts. The period from the late 1940s to the 1950s has been called the "Golden Age of the Western." Johnson returned to the movie business with his first credited role in South of Death Valley, released on August 8, 1949. His next film was the Bandit King of Texas, released on August 29, 1949. He acted in both films using his new Screen moniker of Richard Emory. In 1950, he made three more movies. 

After her marriage in 1944, Hall's movie career wound down. In 1950, she found work on the television series, The Cisco Kid. She appeared in three episodes of  airing on December 19, 1950, January 27, 1951, and September 3, 1951. While Hall was working on The Cisco Kid, her brother was in the initial stages of his budding acting career. Emory also found work in the same television series, although the two never appeared together. Emory acted in episodes aired on December 12, 1950, and January 2, 1951. In 1952, Ellen Hall retired from acting. She was 29 years old.

Emory acted in various movie genres, including adventure, comedy, science fiction, Westerns, and musicals. A full third of his artistic output was in the Western genre. These films included Code of the Silver Sage, Gene Autry and the Mounties, Little Big Horn, Hellgate and Perils of the Wilderness. On television, a third of his output was westerns, including roles in "The Cisco Kid", "The Roy Rogers Show", "Bat Masterson", "The Gene Autry Show" and "The Adventures of Rin Tin Tin".

Between 1930 and 1961, Emory acted in thirty-two movies. One-third of his movie output was Westerns. He made ten straight westerns starting in 1949 with South of Death Valley and finishing with Perils of the Wilderness released in January 1956. Richard Emory's last movie was  The Sergeant Was a Lady, a comedy released in October 1961. Fourteen of his movie roles were uncredited. During his acting career, he also had thirty-eight television appearances. One-half of those roles were in westerns.

Emory was  years old when he retired from acting. His final role was playing an intern in the television series "Perry Mason". Episode 180 aired on May 9, 1963.

Post career
His third and final Marriage in  Los Angeles, California on February 7, 1960, to Ila Irene Ferguson.

In 1963, after acting in the Perry Mason episode, he walked away from his acting career at the age of 44. After Johnson retired from acting, he sold insurance and real estate. "If I thought it was a great house I could sell it," Johnson stated, but his wife added, "He was just as inclined to say 'I don't think you'd like this', so that was that."

In 1966, Johnson “went to Valley College and worked for ten years in landscape and gardening. “ In 1976, Emory retired from his job at the college at the age of 57. In 1980 they moved to the small community of Jemez Springs, New Mexico. Here Emory enjoyed “working in his garden where he grew yams, various hot chilies, and just loved to garden and grow things.”

In the early 1990s they moved to Moab, Utah. The move explains why Johnson is listed on the "Brief Biographies of Latter Day Saint and Utah Film Personalities" website. The listing is based on being a Film Personality living in Utah, not necessarily being a member of the LDS church.
Emory Waldemar Johnson died in 1994.

Marriage
Johnson was married three times. In 1940, he was living with his mother and two sisters when he turned twenty-one. On October 16, 1940, Johnson registered for the draft, then enlisted in the Marine Corps reserves in November. He was home for Christmas in December 1940.

Marriage 1940
Johnson's first marriage was to Elizabeth Catherine Graham of Beverly Hills, California. The wedding had earmarks of a rushed decision to elope. They were married in Yuma, Arizona, on December 27, 1940. Both were 21, celebrated the same birthdate, and traveled 300 miles from Los Angeles to Yuma for a quick marriage. Why get married in Yuma?

Getting a marriage license in Arizona was pretty easy compared with other states. In Arizona, there was no waiting period or blood tests. You could get married the same day you apply for your marriage license. Many anxious Californians eloped to Arizona to avoid the California three-day waiting period.

Love languished; sometime between April 12, 1949, and April 12, 1950, they divorced. In the 1950 Census, dated April 13, 1950, Johnson claims he was Never Married (Single) and was an unemployed actor. Later in the form, Emory stated he had been married previously and only divorced less than one year. There were no children. After his enlistment and marriage, he still found time to act in the movie, I Wanted Wings.  Paramount released the picture on March 26, 1941.

Marriage 1952
Emory spent countless hours doing Location shooting in the town of Pioneertown, California. The location was used extensively to stage western productions. Richard met his second wife while on location for the movie Gene Autry and the Mounties released in January 1951.

Emory Waldemar Johnson married his second wife, in Los Angeles, California, on January 26, 1952. There are two entries in the California Department of Health and Welfare for the Johnson 1952 marriage. The first marriage registration was to  This entry was the women's maiden name. The second entry was to  This entry was her married name after her first marriage. In 1945, Margaret Lafontaine, age , married  in Yuma, Arizona. He was  years old. They had two sons, Michael, born in 1946, and Stephen, born in 1948.

When the Johnson-Besancon marriage ended, they had no children of their own. She remarried in 1957.

Marriage 1960
Emory Waldemar Johnson married his third wife  in Los Angeles, California, on February 7, 1960. This marriage endured, and they were still married at the time of his death in 1994. She died in Moab, Utah, in 2003.

Death
Emory Waldemar Johnson died of a stroke on February 15, 1994, in Moab, Utah. He was   years old. Unlike his parents and two siblings, he chose not to be interred with the rest of the family at Forest Lawn Memorial Park in California. Emory had a non-cemetery burial in Utah. The exact location was not disclosed.

Emory's father died in San Mateo, California on April 18, 1960  from burns suffered in a fire. He was   years old. 
Emory's mother was residing in Los Angeles, California at the time of her death on September 3, 1981. She was   years old.

Filmography

Television

Notes

References

Further reading

External links
 
 
 Richard Emory at the TCM Movie Database
 Richard Emory LDS Listing

Male actors from Santa Barbara, California
American male television actors
American male film actors
1919 births
1994 deaths
20th-century American male actors
People from Jemez Springs, New Mexico
People from Moab, Utah